Mishan-e Olya (also Romanized as Mīshān-e ‘Olyā; also known as Mīshān) is a village in Mishan Rural District, Mahvarmilani District, Mamasani County, Fars Province, Iran. At the 2006 census, its population was 618, in 141 families.

References 

Populated places in Mamasani County